The following outline is provided as an overview of and topical guide to the Central African Republic:

Central African Republic – landlocked sovereign country located in Central Africa.  The CAR borders Chad in the north, South Sudan in the east, Sudan in the north-east, the Republic of the Congo and the Democratic Republic of the Congo in the south, and Cameroon in the west. The Central African Republic Bush War began in 2004 and, despite a peace treaty in 2007 and another in 2011, fighting broke out between government, Muslim, and Christian factions in December 2012, leading to ethnic and religious cleansing and massive population displacement in 2013 and 2014. It is one of the poorest countries in the world.

General reference

 Common English country name:  The Central African Republic
 Official English country name:  The Central African Republic
 Common endonym(s):  
 Official endonym(s):  
 Adjectival(s): Central African
 Demonym(s):
 ISO country codes: CF, CAF, 140
 ISO region codes: See ISO 3166-2:CF
 Internet country code top-level domain: .cf

Geography of the Central African Republic

Geography of the Central African Republic
 The Central African Republic is: a landlocked country
 Location:
 Southern Hemisphere and Eastern Hemisphere
 Africa
 Central Africa
 Middle Africa
 Time zone:  West Africa Time (UTC+01)
 Extreme points of the Central African Republic
 High:  Mont Ngaoui 
 Low:  Ubangi River 
 Land boundaries:  5,203 km
 1,577 km
 1,197 km
 175 km
 990 km
 797 km
 467 km
 Coastline:  none
 Population of the Central African Republic: 4,216,666(2007) - 124th most populous country

 Area of the Central African Republic:  - 43rd largest country
 Atlas of the Central African Republic

Environment of the Central African Republic

 Climate of the Central African Republic
 Ecoregions in the Central African Republic
 Wildlife of the Central African Republic
 Fauna of the Central African Republic
 Birds of the Central African Republic
 Mammals of the Central African Republic

Natural geographic features of the Central African Republic
 Glaciers in the Central African Republic: none 
 Mountains of the Central African Republic
 Rivers of the Central African Republic
 World Heritage Sites in the Central African Republic

Regions of the Central African Republic

Regions of the Central African Republic

Ecoregions of the Central African Republic

List of ecoregions in the Central African Republic

Administrative divisions of the Central African Republic

Administrative divisions of the Central African Republic
 Prefectures of the Central African Republic
 Sub-prefectures of the Central African Republic

Prefectures of the Central African Republic

Prefectures of the Central African Republic

Sub-prefectures of the Central African Republic

Sub-prefectures of the Central African Republic

Municipalities of the Central African Republic
 Capital of the Central African Republic: Bangui
 Cities of the Central African Republic

Demography of the Central African Republic

Demographics of the Central African Republic

Government and politics of the Central African Republic

Politics of the Central African Republic
 Form of government: presidential republic
 Capital of the Central African Republic: Bangui
 Elections in the Central African Republic
 Political parties in the Central African Republic

Branches of the government of the Central African Republic

Government of the Central African Republic

Executive branch of the government of the Central African Republic
 Head of state: President of the Central African Republic
 Head of government: President of the Central African Republic
 Central African Republic Council of Ministers

Legislative branch of the government of the Central African Republic
 National Assembly of the Central African Republic (unicameral)

Judicial branch of the government of the Central African Republic

Court system of the Central African Republic

Foreign relations of the Central African Republic

Foreign relations of the Central African Republic
 Diplomatic missions in the Central African Republic
 Diplomatic missions of the Central African Republic

International organization membership
The Central African Republic is a member of:

 African, Caribbean, and Pacific Group of States (ACP)
 African Development Bank Group (AfDB)
 African Union (AU)
 Conference des Ministres des Finances des Pays de la Zone Franc (FZ)
 Development Bank of Central African States (BDEAC)
 Economic and Monetary Community of Central Africa (CEMAC)
 Food and Agriculture Organization (FAO)
 Group of 77 (G77)
 International Atomic Energy Agency (IAEA)
 International Bank for Reconstruction and Development (IBRD)
 International Civil Aviation Organization (ICAO)
 International Criminal Court (ICCt)
 International Criminal Police Organization (Interpol)
 International Development Association (IDA)
 International Federation of Red Cross and Red Crescent Societies (IFRCS)
 International Finance Corporation (IFC)
 International Fund for Agricultural Development (IFAD)
 International Labour Organization (ILO)
 International Monetary Fund (IMF)
 International Olympic Committee (IOC)
 International Red Cross and Red Crescent Movement (ICRM)

 International Telecommunication Union (ITU)
 International Telecommunications Satellite Organization (ITSO)
 International Trade Union Confederation (ITUC)
 Multilateral Investment Guarantee Agency (MIGA)
 Nonaligned Movement (NAM)
 Organisation internationale de la Francophonie (OIF)
 Organisation of Islamic Cooperation (OIC) (observer)
 Organisation for the Prohibition of Chemical Weapons (OPCW)
 United Nations (UN)
 United Nations Conference on Trade and Development (UNCTAD)
 United Nations Educational, Scientific, and Cultural Organization (UNESCO)
 United Nations Industrial Development Organization (UNIDO)
 Universal Postal Union (UPU)
 World Confederation of Labour (WCL)
 World Customs Organization (WCO)
 World Federation of Trade Unions (WFTU)
 World Health Organization (WHO)
 World Intellectual Property Organization (WIPO)
 World Meteorological Organization (WMO)
 World Tourism Organization (UNWTO)
 World Trade Organization (WTO)

Law and order in the Central African Republic

Law of the Central African Republic
 Constitution of the Central African Republic
 Human rights in the Central African Republic
 LGBT rights in the Central African Republic
 Freedom of religion in the Central African Republic
 Law enforcement in the Central African Republic

Military of the Central African Republic

Military of the Central African Republic
 Command
 Commander-in-chief:
 Forces
 Army of the Central African Republic
 Navy of the Central African Republic
 Air Force of the Central African Republic

Local government in the Central African Republic

Local government in the Central African Republic

History of the Central African Republic
History of the Central African Republic

History by subject 
History of rail transport in the Central African Republic
Postage stamps and postal history of the Central African Republic

Culture of the Central African Republic

Culture of the Central African Republic
 Centrafrican cuisine
 Languages of the Central African Republic
 Media in the Central African Republic
 National symbols of the Central African Republic
 Coat of arms of the Central African Republic
 Flag of the Central African Republic
 National anthem of the Central African Republic
 People of the Central African Republic
 Gbaya people
 Mandja people
 Public holidays in the Central African Republic
 Religion in the Central African Republic
 Christianity in the Central African Republic
 Baptist Churches of the Central African Republic
 Roman Catholicism in the Central African Republic
 Hinduism in the Central African Republic
 Islam in the Central African Republic
 World Heritage Sites in the Central African Republic

Art in the Central African Republic
 Museums in the Central African Republic
 Music of the Central African Republic

Sports in the Central African Republic

Sports in the Central African Republic
 Football in the Central African Republic
 Central African Republic at the Olympics

Economy and infrastructure of the Central African Republic

Economy of the Central African Republic
 Economic rank, by nominal GDP (2007): 157th (one hundred and fifth seventh)
 Agriculture in the Central African Republic
 Banking in the Central African Republic
 Communications in the Central African Republic
 Internet in the Central African Republic
 Companies of the Central African Republic
 Currency of the Central African Republic: Franc
 ISO 4217: XAF
 Energy in the Central African Republic
 Health care in the Central African Republic
 Mining in the Central African Republic
 Tourism in the Central African Republic
 Transport in the Central African Republic
 Airports in the Central African Republic
 Rail transport in the Central African Republic

Education in the Central African Republic

Education in the Central African Republic

See also

Central African Republic
 List of Central African Republic-related topics
 All pages with titles beginning with Central African Republic
 All pages with titles beginning with Central Africa
 All pages with titles beginning with Central African
 All pages with titles containing Central African Republic
 All pages with titles containing Central Africa
 All pages with titles containing Central African
 List of international rankings
 Member state of the United Nations
 Outline of Africa
 Outline of geography

References

Central African Republic